Kevin Byers (born 23 August 1979) is a Scottish footballer, who played in the Scottish Football League for Raith Rovers, Inverness Caledonian Thistle, Montrose, Forfar Athletic and Brechin City. He is currently the manager of Kennoway Star Hearts in the SJFA East Superleague.

External links

References

1979 births
Living people
Association football midfielders
Scottish footballers
Raith Rovers F.C. players
Inverness Caledonian Thistle F.C. players
Montrose F.C. players
Forfar Athletic F.C. players
Brechin City F.C. players
Ballingry Rovers F.C. players
Kennoway Star Hearts J.F.C. players
Scottish Football League players
Scottish Junior Football Association players
Scottish football managers
Footballers from Kirkcaldy